Harry Willis Allen (1892-1981) was an entomologist involved with the United States Department of Agriculture. He was the president of the American Entomological Society, and is considered a world authority on wasps.

Bibliography
 North American species of two-winged flies belonging to the tribe Miltogrammini, Volume 68 of Proceedings of the United States National Museum. [Offprint]. Ohio State University, 1926.
 A revision of Neotiphia Malloch and Krombeinia Pate: (Hymenoptera, Tiphidae) (co-authored with Karl V. Krombein). Published in 1964.
 Redescriptions of Types of Tiphiinae from Asia, Africa, Oceania in the British Museum (NH) and at Oxford University. American Entomological Society, 1969.
 A Monographic Study of the Subfamily Tiphiinae Hymenoptera: Tiphiidae of South America, Volume 113 of Smithsonian Contributions to zoology. Smithsonian Inst. Press, 1972.
 The Genus Tiphia of the Indian Subcontinent; Technical Bulletin No. 1509, Agricultural Research Service. United States Department of Agriculture, Washington, D.C. Issued July 1975.

References

1892 births
1981 deaths
American entomologists
20th-century American zoologists